Four ships of the French Navy have borne the name Le Malin ("clever one" in French, or alternatively "the naughty" or "the devil").

 A cutter (1780–1786)
 A cutter (1795–1803) 
  is a support ship from which the Commando Hubert operates.

French Navy ship names